The Mirchi Music Award for Upcoming Male Vocalist of The Year, is given yearly by Radio Mirchi as a part of its annual Mirchi Music Awards for Hindi films.

This award is often given to recognise a male vocalist who has delivered an outstanding performance in a film song.

List of winners
 2008 Benny Dayal - "Kaise Mujhe" from Ghajini
 Karthik - "Behka" from Ghajini
 Rashid Ali - "Kabhi Kabhi Aditi" from Jaane Tu... Ya Jaane Na
 Benny Dayal & Satish Chakavarthy - "Nazrein Milana Nazrein Churana" from Jaane Tu... Ya Jaane Na
 Farhan Akhtar - "Socha Hai" from Rock On!!
 2009 Raja Hasan - "Dhun Lagi" from Jai Veeru
 Xulfi - "Ye Pal" from Aasma
 Suraj Jagan & Sharman Joshi - "Give Me Some Sunshine" from 3 Idiots
 Mohan - "Khanabadosh" from London Dreams
 Amit Trivedi - "Nayan Tarse" from Dev.D
 2010 Mustafa Kutoane & Kirti Sagathia - "Beera" from Raavan
 Najam Sheraz - "Tere Bina Jiya Na Jaye" from Shaapit
 Bhadwai Village Mandali - "Mehngai Dayain" from Peepli Live
 Mohan - "Naav" from Udaan
 Mohammed Irfan - "Salaam Zindagi" from Lamhaa
 2011 Kamal Khan - "Ishq Sufiyana" from The Dirty Picture
 Harshit Saxena - Haal-E-Dil from Murder 2
 Shahid Mallya - Rabba Main Toh Mar Gaya Oye" from Mausam
 Hrithik Roshan & Abhay Deol - "Senorita" from Zindagi Na Milegi Dobara
 2012  Arijit Singh - "Duaa" from Shanghai
 Arijit Singh - "Phir Le Aya Dil (Reprise)" from Barfi!
 Nikhil Paul George - "Main Kya Karoon" from Barfi!
 Nikhil Paul George - "Aashiyan" from Barfi!
 Javed Bashir - "Tera Naam Japdi Phiran" from Cocktail
 Ayushmann Khurrana - Pani Da Rang" from Vicky Donor	
 2013 Ankit Tiwari - "Sunn Raha Hai" from Aashiqui 2
 Siddharth Mahadevan - "Zinda" from Bhaag Milkha Bhaag Siddharth Mahadevan - "Bhaag Milkha Bhaag" from Bhaag Milkha Bhaag
 Siddharth Mahadevan - "Malang" from Dhoom 3
 Jaswinder Singh - "Raanjhanaa" from Raanjhanaa
 2014 Gulraj Singh - "Pakeezah" from Ungli
 Rupesh Kumar Ram - "Ranjha" from Queen
 Armaan Malik - "Naina" from Khoobsurat
 Khurram Iqbal - "Ishq Khuda" from Heartless
 Shadab Faridi - "Jashn-E-Ishqa" from Gunday
 2015 Jubin Nautiyal - "Zindagi Kuch Toh Bata (Reprise)" from Bajrangi Bhaijaan
 Brijesh Shandilya - "Banno" from tanu Weds Manu Returns
 Amaal Mallik - "O Khuda" from Hero
 Zeeshan Ahmed - "Wajah Tum Ho" from Hate Story 3
 Ami Mishra - "Hasi" from Hamari Adhuri Kahani
 Amit Mishra - "Manma Emotion Jaage" from Dilwale
 2016 Sarwar Khan & Sartaz Khan Barna - "HaaniKaarak Bapu" from Dangal
 Jaswinder Singh Bunty - "Tumhe Bhi Meri Yaad" from 30 Minutes
 Yasser Desai - "Rang Reza" from Beiimaan Love
 Arko Pravo Mukherjee - "Dariya" from Baar Baar Dekho
 Arko Pravo Mukherjee - "Tere Bin Yaara" from Rustom
 2017 Asit Tripathy - "Tu Banja Gali Benaras Ki" from Shaadi Mein Zaroor Aana 
 Master Armaan Hasan - "Kankad" from Shubh Mangal Saavdhan
 Sudeep Jaipurwale - "Be Nazaara" from Mom
 Tushar Joshi - "Musafir" from Jagga Jasoos
 Kaala Bhairava - "Shivam" from Baahubali 2
 2018 Abhay Jodhpurkar - "Mere Naam Tu" from Zero 
 Prateek Kuhad - "Saansein" from Karwaan
 Prateek Kuhad - "Kadam" from Karwaan
 Jazim Sharma - "Grey Walaa Shade" from Manmarziyaan
 Jazim Sharma - "Chonch Ladhiyaan" from Manmarziyaan
 Rahul Jain - "Aanewale Kal" from 1921
 2019

See also
 Mirchi Music Awards
 Bollywood
 Cinema of India

References

Mirchi Music Awards